Dada is Back is a 2017 Indian Kannada crime film directed by Santhosh produced by Ajay Raj Urs and Dr Shankar under the Apple Films & Dayanand Sounds production The film stars Arun Kumar, Ajay Raj Urs, Shravya along with the Tamil actor R. Parthiepan, making his debut in Kannada cinema. The film's score and soundtrack are composed by Anoop Seelin whilst the cinematography is by Nagesh Acharya.

The film's trailer was officially released on 1 April 2017 by actor Sudeep in Bangalore. The film was released across Karnataka on 21 July 2017.

Cast
 R. Parthiepan as Tippu
 Arun Kumar
 Ajay Raj Urs
 Shravya
 Sudharani
 Sharath Lohitashwa as Delli
 Raghava Uday

Soundtrack

Anoop Seelin composed the film's background and scored for its soundtrack. The soundtrack album consists of five tracks, including one theme song.

Review
The Times of India reviewed the film giving 3 stars out of 5 and remarked that the film is for "those who like tales revolving crime and underworld. Though, it doesn't provide as much action one would expect from an underworld film".

References

External links
 About Dada is Back
 Indiaglitz review

2017 films
2010s Kannada-language films
Indian crime drama films
Indian gangster films
Films scored by Anoop Seelin